Dirt track racing is the single most common form of auto racing in the United States. According to the National Speedway Directory, there are over 700 dirt oval tracks in operation in the US.

The composition of the dirt on tracks has an effect on the amount of grip available. Many tracks use clay with a specific mixture of dirt. Tracks are sometimes banked in the turns and on the straights. This banking is utilized primarily to allow vehicles to carry more speed through the corners. However, some tracks prefer less banked turns.

Notable dirt tracks

Race track listings by state

Alabama

Alaska

Arizona

|Adobe Mountain Speedway||Glendale||1/5 semi-banked clay oval||NOW 600 micro sprints, dwarf cars, flat track motorcycles||

Arkansas

California

Colorado

Delaware

Florida

Georgia

Idaho

Illinois

Indiana

Iowa

Kansas

Kentucky

Louisiana

Maryland

The Greater Cumberland Speedway Cumberland Maryland

Massachusetts

Michigan

Minnesota

Mississippi

Missouri

Montana

Nebraska

Nevada

New Hampshire

New Jersey

New York

North Carolina

North Dakota

Ohio

Oklahoma

Oregon

Pennsylvania

South Carolina

South Dakota

Tennessee

Texas

Vermont

Virginia

Washington

West Virginia

Wisconsin

Wyoming

References

External links

 Racetracks 

 National Speedway Directory
 Active dirt tracks in the United States on dirtFan.com
 The Third Turn

 Sprints and midgets

 All Star Circuit of Champions
 Lucas Oil American Sprint Car Series
 King of the West NARC Sprints
 POWRi
 Xtreme Outlaw Series
 World of Outlaws Sprint Car Series

 Dirt late models

 Lucas Oil Dirt Late Model Series
 World of Outlaws Late Model Series
 XR Super Series

 Dirt modifieds

 International Motor Contest Association (IMCA)
 Super DIRTcar Series

Ovals